Raiders of Red Gap is a 1943 American Western film directed by Sam Newfield and written by Joseph O'Donnell. The film stars Robert Livingston as the Lone Rider and Al St. John as his sidekick "Fuzzy Jones", with Myrna Dell, Ed Cassidy, Charles King and Kermit Maynard. The film was released on September 30, 1943, by Producers Releasing Corporation.

This is the seventeenth and last movie in the "Lone Rider" series, and the sixth starring Robert Livingston. The first eleven movies star George Houston.

After this film, Livingston returned to Republic Pictures to replace Eddie Dew in the "John Paul Revere" series, starting with Pride of the Plains. PRC dropped the "Lone Rider" series, but continued two other series: the "Billy the Kid" films and the "Texas Rangers" series.

Plot
A group of ranchers fight back against a crooked cattle syndicate trying to drive them off their land. The head of the syndicate hires a gunslinger to take care of the ranchers, but the hired gun is actually Fuzzy Jones in disguise.

Cast          
Robert Livingston as Rocky Cameron, the Lone Rider
Al St. John as Fuzzy Q. Jones
Myrna Dell as Jane Roberts
Ed Cassidy as Jim Roberts
Charles King as Jack Bennett
Kermit Maynard as Bradley
Roy Brent as Butch Crane
Frank Ellis as Jed
George Chesebro as Sheriff Evans

See also
The "Lone Rider" films starring George Houston:
 The Lone Rider Rides On (1941)
 The Lone Rider Crosses the Rio (1941)
 The Lone Rider in Ghost Town (1941)
 The Lone Rider in Frontier Fury (1941)
 The Lone Rider Ambushed (1941)
 The Lone Rider Fights Back (1941)
 The Lone Rider and the Bandit (1942)
 The Lone Rider in Cheyenne (1942)
 The Lone Rider in Texas Justice (1942)
 Border Roundup (1942)
 Outlaws of Boulder Pass (1942)
starring Robert Livingston: 
 Overland Stagecoach (1942)
 Wild Horse Rustlers (1943)
 Death Rides the Plains (1943)
 Wolves of the Range (1943)
 Law of the Saddle (1943)
 Raiders of Red Gap (1943)

References

External links
 

1943 films
American Western (genre) films
1943 Western (genre) films
Producers Releasing Corporation films
Films directed by Sam Newfield
American black-and-white films
1940s English-language films
1940s American films